The Naylor Prize and lectureship in Applied Mathematics is a prize of the London Mathematical Society awarded every two years in memory of Dr V.D. Naylor. Only those who reside in the United Kingdom are eligible for the prize. The "grounds for award can include work in, and influence on, and contributions to applied mathematics and/or the applications of mathematics, and lecturing gifts."

Prize winners

 1977 James Lighthill
 1979 Basil John Mason
 1981 H. Christopher Longuet-Higgins
 1983 Michael J. D. Powell
 1985 I C Percival
 1987 Douglas Samuel Jones
 1989 J D Murray
 1991 Roger Penrose
 1993 Michael Berry
 1995 John Ball
 1997 Frank Kelly
 1999 Stephen Hawking
 2000 Athanassios S. Fokas
 2002 Mark H. A. Davis
 2004 Richard Jozsa
 2007 Michael Green
 2009 Philip Maini
 2011 John Bryce McLeod
 2013 Nick Trefethen
 2015 S. Jonathan Chapman
 2017 John King
 2019 Nicholas Higham
 2021 Endre Süli

See also
 Whitehead Prize
 Senior Whitehead Prize
 Shephard Prize
 Fröhlich Prize
 Berwick Prize
 Pólya Prize (LMS)
 De Morgan Medal
 List of mathematics awards

References

Awards established in 1977
British science and technology awards
Awards of the London Mathematical Society